The Sri Sri Radha Krishna Temple in Utah County, United States is a Hindu temple dedicated to Radha Krishna. It was built to meet the needs of the Hindu community in Utah County. The temple hosts many seasonal festivals, events and weekly services for prayer and meditation.

History 

The history behind the Sri Sri Radha Krishna temple is rooted in devoted members of the International Society for Krishna Consciousness (ISKCON) and their efforts to bring awareness of their religion and Indian culture to the wider world. The influence of this movement can be traced back thousands of years to the basic beliefs surrounding Krishna, and additionally to modern advocates for Krishna Consciousness like Swami Prabhupada.

The Sri Sri Radha Krishna temple is in existence mainly due to the efforts of Charu Das (formerly Christopher Warden) and his activity within ISKCON. Charu Das, an American by birth, left the United States in order to protest and avoid the Vietnam War. He then traveled through Europe, India, and Singapore. While in Singapore he met his future wife, and the two of them began a lifetime of work to further Krishna Consciousness. The two went to Australia, where they lived and worked for a time. After spending several years with a community of Krishna devotees, Charu left Australia and returned to the United States where he served in several positions for ISKCON.

Charu Das first visited Utah in 1975 when he traveled to Brigham Young University (BYU) to sell books for a trust under ISKCON. His impressions were positive, and he appreciated the atmosphere of tolerance and interest. Years later, after leaving his position at a temple near Berkeley, he returned to Utah. On November 10, 1996 ground breaking ceremonies were held at the temple's current location, just south of Spanish Fork, and on February 16, 1998, the construction of the temple began.

The Sri Sri Radha Krishna temple continues to thrive each year as it attracts thousands of guests for both tours and seasonal festivals.

Events and festivals

The temple houses a natural amphitheater with the capacity to accommodate thousands. There is a gift shop on site as well. There are many different visitors such as schools, scout troops, summer or senior organizations, and family reunions.

Annually, the biggest celebration in the Western Hemisphere of the Holi festival (also known as the Festival of Colors) is held here, typically teaching a Hindu message to a vast audience of diverse ages and religious backgrounds. Visitors can buy different colored powder (gulaal) imported from India, to throw at each other and into the air at specific times throughout the day, while live bands perform music. A replica of Holika the witch is burned in a bonfire.

Weekly services

The services at the Krishna temple are open to the public every day from 6:00 am to 7:30 pm. Every Sunday at 5:00 pm, a feast and regular services are held and are open to students. Free yoga and meditation classes are also available.

References

External links

 Sri Sri Radha Krishna Temple (Spanish Fork)

Radha Krishna temples
Hindu temples in Utah
Krishna temples
Religious buildings and structures in Utah County, Utah
International Society for Krishna Consciousness temples
Buildings and structures in Spanish Fork, Utah
1998 establishments in Utah
Asian-American culture in Utah